Wampi may be:
a common name for the Clausena lansium, a tree species of Southeast Asia
one local name for the rakali, a rodent of Australia
one type of wampum beads traditionally used by some Native American peoples of the eastern United States

See also 
 Wampis language, of Peru
 Wampis people, an ethnic group of Peru